Forest City Community School District is a rural public school district headquartered in Forest City, Iowa.

The district is located in sections of Hancock, Winnebago, Worth and Cerro Gordo counties. It serves Forest City, Crystal Lake, Fertile, Leland, Woden, and the surrounding rural areas.

On July 1, 2013, the Woden–Crystal Lake Community School District consolidated into the Forest City district.

Schools
The district operates three schools, all in Forest City:
 Forest City Elementary School
 Forest City Middle School
 Forest City High School

Forest City High School

Athletics
The Indians participate in the Top of Iowa Conference in the following sports:
Football
Cross Country
Volleyball
Basketball
Boys' 1976 Class 2A State Champions
Bowling
Wrestling
Golf
Track and Field
Baseball
 1976 Class 2A State Champions 
Softball

See also
List of school districts in Iowa
List of high schools in Iowa

References

Further reading
 District boundaries prior to the Woden-Crystal Lake merger (Focus on Forest City) - Iowa Secretary of State

External links
 Forest City Community School District

School districts in Iowa
Education in Cerro Gordo County, Iowa
Education in Hancock County, Iowa
Education in Winnebago County, Iowa
Education in Worth County, Iowa